Events from 2021 in French Polynesia.

Incumbents 

 President: Édouard Fritch
 President of the Assembly: Gaston Tong Sang

Events 
Ongoing – COVID-19 pandemic in French Polynesia

 23 August – The French overseas department of French Polynesia closes all schools and tightens its lockdown for two weeks amid an increase in the number of COVID-19 cases caused by the Delta variant.
 3 September – French Polynesia extends their COVID-19 lockdown to September 20 following the deaths of more than 200 people over the past two weeks. The lockdown extension will apply to the Society Islands and the Tuamotus archipelago as the number of cases increase in those regions.

Deaths 

 22 March – Tapeta Tetopata, 67, politician, member of the Assembly (since 2018)

References 

2021 in French Polynesia
2020s in French Polynesia
Years of the 21st century in French Polynesia
French Polynesia